Co-pilot Glacier is a short, steep tributary glacier, flowing from the western and southern slopes of Mount Overlord to the upper part of Aviator Glacier in Victoria Land. It was named by the northern party of the New Zealand Geological Survey Antarctic Expedition, 1962–63, in recognition of services rendered by pilots of U.S. Navy Squadron VX-6, and in association with nearby Pilot Glacier.

See also
 List of glaciers in the Antarctic
 Glaciology

References
 

Glaciers of Borchgrevink Coast